The Helmholtz Graduate School Environmental Health (HELENA), located in Neuherberg north of Munich, was opened on November 1, 2010. It is a joint initiative for the promotion of doctoral students of the Helmholtz Zentrum München - German Research Center for Environmental Health, the Ludwig-Maximilians-Universität München, and the Technische Universität München.

Description
With its orientation on Environmental Health, HELENA focuses thematically on the pathogenic processes of common diseases that affect a large number of people, such as chronic lung diseases, diabetes, cardiovascular diseases, cancer, Alzheimer’s disease and depression. These diseases develop out of a complex interaction of individual genetic predisposition and environmental influences such as food, lifestyle, stress, or pollutants.

The structured program of the Helmholtz graduate school HELENA offers participants an individualized course of study within eight thematic tracks, which cover the entire spectrum of Environmental Health research. Additionally, the promotion of competence in management, leadership, and communication lays the foundation for a successful scientific career. Each doctoral student can choose his/her personal curriculum individually from the offering.

Thematic fields of education

Lung Biology and Disease
Diabetes and Metabolic Diseases
Neuro and Stem Cell Biology
Systems Biology, Imaging and Structural Biology
Ecosystems Biology
Epidemiology, Health Economics and Human Genetics
Infection, Immune and Tumor Biology
Radiation Research

Organisation

 Advisory board (scientific orientation)
 Management board with representatives of the universities, the Helmholtz Zentrum München, and the graduate students
 Thesis committee (supervision of the students' work)
 Graduate student office provides service

A thesis committee guides graduate students during their doctoral studies. The committee is composed of the direct mentor, the doctoral supervisor, and an external expert. At annual meetings, the progress of a project is reviewed. After two-and-a-half years, in consultation with the thesis committee, the student has a plan in place to complete their scientific work.

References 

Postgraduate schools in Germany
Universities and colleges in Bavaria
Education in Munich